David Marchick (born 1966) is an American attorney, businessman, academic, and diplomat who serves as Dean of the Kogod School of Business at American University. He previously served as chief operating officer of the United States International Development Finance Corporation during the first year of the Biden Administration. He previously served as Director of the Center for Presidential Transition, as a Senior Executive at The Carlyle Group and in four departments in the Clinton Administration. He is the co-author of the book, "The Peaceful Transfer of Power: An Oral History of America's Presidential Transitions", published by UVA press.

After working in the Clinton Administration, Marchick joined Washington, D.C. based international law firm Covington & Burling in March 2002. In October 2007, Marchick joined The Carlyle Group, a Washington, D.C.-based asset management firm as managing director and its global head of regulatory affairs.

At Carlyle, Marchick launched and supervised Carlyle's sustainability initiatives. He was also active in driving diversity initiatives at Carlyle and in the finance industry, including through his Chairmanship of the Robert Toigo Foundation.

Marchick retired from the Carlyle Group in December 2018. After Carlyle, he served as the Director of the Center for Presidential Transition at the Partnership for Public Service, an adjunct professor at the Tuck School of Business, and Senior Counsel at Covington & Burling. Marchick hosted the podcast Transition Lab.

Early life and education
Marchick was born in 1966 and raised in Orinda, California. He attended the College Preparatory School before earning a Bachelor of Arts from the University of California, San Diego in 1988. While at UC San Diego, Marchick was student body president. Marchick later earned a master's degree in public policy at the Lyndon B. Johnson School of Public Affairs at the University of Texas in Austin, and a Juris Doctor from the George Washington University Law School in Washington, D.C.

Career

1990s
Marchick started his service in the Clinton Administration In 1993, Marchick became the deputy director of presidential correspondence. Marchick joined the Office of the United States Trade Representative in early 1993. In May 1996, Marchick was appointed by United States Secretary of Commerce Mickey Kantor to being deputy assistant secretary for trade development.

By January 1998, Marchick held the position of Deputy United States Assistant Secretary of State. Marchick led negotiations with China to expand air passenger and cargo services between the United States and China.

In October 1999, Marchick left the U.S. State Department to join the newly formed Bid4Assets, a website for bankrupt businesses to auction off their assets.

2000s
In March 2002, Marchick joined Covington & Burling, an international law firm. At Covington, Marchick began work on international transportation and trade issues. In September 2003, Covington formed a business alliance with Kissinger-McLarty Associates. In 2006, Marchick co-authored the book, U.S. National Security and Foreign Direct Investment, and focused his law practice on representing companies, such as IBM, seeking approval from the Committee on Foreign Investment in the United States (CFIUS), an inter-agency committee of the United States Government that reviews the national security implications of foreign investments in U.S. companies or operations.

Marchick served vice chair of Covington & Burling's international practice

In October 2007, Marchick joined The Carlyle Group, a Washington, D.C. based global asset management firm specializing in private equity. Marchick was hired for the newly created position of managing director of Carlyle's regulatory affairs. As a managing director, Marchick was responsible for regulatory issues in countries where Carlyle operates. Marchick was also responsible for supervising firm's branding and communications, research and sustainability issues. Marchick later served on Carlyle's Operating Committee and Management Committee.

In support of his work on domestic manufacturing investments, Marchick was awarded the "Solidarity and Appreciation Award" by the United Steelworkers.

Marchick retired from the Carlyle Group in December 2018.

After Carlyle, he served as Director of the Center for Presidential Transition at the Partnership for Public Service, an adjunct professor at the Tuck School of Business at Dartmouth, and Senior Of Counsel at the law firm Covington & Burling. As Director of the Center for Presidential Transition, he worked on a non-partisan basis on the Presidential Transition of 2020.

As Chief Operating Officer of the United States International Development Finance Corporation, Marchick served as the senior Biden appointee at the agency. During his tenure, DFC invested more than any time in the agency's 25-year history and invested in vaccine manufacturing capacity for 2 billion doses of COVID-19 vaccines.

He serves on the National Council of the National Park Foundation and the governing council for the United States Holocaust Memorial Museum.

In 2022, he was appointed as the Dean of the Kogod School of Business at American University. With nearly 2,000 students and more than two dozen undergraduate and graduate degree and certificate programs, the Kogod School of Business is a leader in business education and is known for its outstanding academic pursuits in sustainability; analytics; cyber management; entrepreneurship; and hands-on learning.

Affiliations
 National Park Foundation, National Council 
 UC San Diego Foundation, Board of Trustees 
 Holocaust Memorial Museum, Member, Council (Board of Trustees)
 Robert F. Toigo Foundation, Former Chairman of the Board of Directors 
 Dartmouth College, Adjunct Professor, Tuck School of Business 
 American University, Dean, Kogod School of Business 
 Transition Lab Podcast, Host

Selected publications

References

1967 births
Clinton administration personnel
George Washington University Law School alumni
Living people
People from Contra Costa County, California
University of California, San Diego alumni
Lyndon B. Johnson School of Public Affairs alumni
People associated with Covington & Burling